Small multidrug resistance protein (also known as  Drug/Metabolite Transporter) is a family of integral membrane proteins that confer drug resistance to a wide range of toxic compounds by removing them for the cells. The efflux is coupled to an influx of protons. An example is Escherichia coli mvrC  which prevents the incorporation of methyl viologen into cells and is involved in ethidium bromide efflux.

References

Protein domains
Protein families
Membrane proteins